The Rack may refer to:
The Rack (1915 film), an American silent drama film
The Rack (1956 film), a courtroom drama starring Paul Newman
The Rack (album), the 1991 debut album by Asphyx
"The Rack" (The Professionals), a 1978 episode of the crime-action drama series

See also
Rack (disambiguation)